Each lobule of the testis is contained in one of the intervals between the fibrous septa which extend between the mediastinum testis and the tunica albuginea, and consists of from one to three, or more, minute convoluted tubes, the tubuli seminiferi.

Additional images

References

External links
  - "Inguinal Region, Scrotum and Testes: The Cross-Section of the Testis"

Mammal male reproductive system